The Pra River is a river in Ghana, the easternmost and the largest of the three principal rivers that drain the area south of the Volta divide. Rising in the Kwahu Plateau near Mpraeso and flowing southward for 240 km through rich cocoa and farming areas and valuable forests in the Akan lowlands, the Pra enters the Gulf of Guinea east of Takoradi.  In the 19th century, the Pra served as the border between the Ashanti Confederacy and the Gold Coast.

The Pra has many cataracts, notably the Bosomasi Rapids at Anyinabrim, and for most of its length is not navigable even by canoe. However, in the early part of the twentieth century the Pra was used extensively to float timber to the coast for export. This trade is now carried by road and rail transportation. The main tributaries are the Ofin, Anum and Birim rivers. The northern part of the Pra is still worked for artisan gold with metallic mercury, which has caused some contamination. The Birim river valley is a major source of diamonds.

Akim Oda is the commercial centre of the northern Pra basin.

References

External links

Rivers of Ghana